Segismundo Moret y Prendergast (2 June 1833 – 28 January 1913) was a Spanish politician and writer. He was the prime minister of Spain on three occasions and the president of the Congress of Deputies on two occasions.

Biography
Moret was born in Cádiz on 2 June 1833. His mother's family, the Prendergasts, were of Irish descent. He studied at the Universidad Central in Madrid, where, in 1858, he became professor of political economy while he continued his studies in jurisprudence.

In 1863, Moret was elected representative to parliament as an independent representing the town of Almadén in the province of Ciudad Real. He was re-elected in 1868 after the Revolution of 1868 and took part in the writing of the new Spanish Constitution of 1869. He was noted for his eloquence.

As Minister of Overseas in the government presided by General Prim in 1870, Moret, himself a member of the Spanish Abolitionist Society, pushed for the abolition of slavery and the creation of a constitution for Puerto Rico. In 1871, he was Minister of the Treasury (hacienda) in the first government of King Amadeo I, and in 1872, he was appointed ambassador in London but resigned months later months and accepted a directorship in a large British bank.

With the restoration of the Bourbon dynasty to the Spanish throne in 1875, Moret returned to Spain, where he founded the Partido Democrático-Monárquico party. He was again elected deputy for Ciudad Real in 1879 and rallied to the monarchy in 1882. In 1883, he was appointed Minister of the Interior (Gobernación), and after 1885, he joined the Liberal Party in which he cooperated with Práxedes Mateo Sagasta as Minister of State (estado, foreign affairs, 1885–1888), Interior (Gobernación, 1888, 1901, 1902), Development (Fomento) (1892), State (Estado, foreign affairs, 1892, 1894) and Overseas Colonies (Ultramar, 1897–1898). When Sagasta died, he participated in the quarrels for the control of the party.

In 1897, as Minister for Overseas Colonies (Ultramar), Moret decreed the autonomy for Cuba and Puerto Rico in a vain attempt to avoid their secession. He opposed the war against the United States in 1898. In 1902, he collaborated in the creation of the Institute of Social Reform, which was a precursor of the future Ministry of Labour.

In 1905, after the resignation of Montero Rios, Moret became prime minister but was forced to resign in July 1906 after he had lost his majority in the parliament (Cortes Generales) although he became again prime minister briefly the same year (30 November – 4 December).

After the bloody confrontations of the "Tragic Week" in 1909 in Barcelona, Moret was again appointed prime minister after the resignation of Antonio Maura while he was also Minister of the Interior. He was forced to resign in February 1910 when he was replaced by José Canalejas. He denounced the Canalejas Ministry as "a democratic flag being used to cover reactionary merchandise".

In 1912, after the assassination of Prime Minister Canalejas and the appointment of a new prime minister, Álvaro Figueroa Torres, Count of Romanones, Moret was elected as the 155th president of the Congress of Deputies, which he was until his death, on 28 January 1913. It was his second term as speaker of the Spanish lower house; from July 15, 1901 to April 3, 1902, he had served as the 147th speaker.

See also
 List of prime ministers of Spain
 Monument to Moret (Cádiz)

References

1833 births
1913 deaths
Politicians from Cádiz
Prime Ministers of Spain
Members of the Royal Spanish Academy
Economy and finance ministers of Spain
Foreign ministers of Spain
19th-century Spanish politicians
Presidents of the Congress of Deputies (Spain)
Liberal Party (Spain, 1880) politicians
Leaders of political parties in Spain
Spanish people of British descent
Complutense University of Madrid
Complutense University of Madrid alumni
Presidents of the Ateneo de Madrid
Interior ministers of Spain
Overseas ministers of Spain
Spanish abolitionists
Honorary Knights Grand Cross of the Royal Victorian Order
Ambassadors of Spain to the United Kingdom of Great Britain and Ireland